BelAZ is a Belarusian automobile plant and one of the world's largest manufacturers of large and especially large dump trucks, as well as other heavy transport equipment for the mining and construction industries.

BelAZ is a site for one of the largest Commonwealth of Independent States investment projects. The factory finalized two of the three scheduled phases of the technical re-equipment and upgrades. The Quality Management System applied in research and development, fabrication, erection and after-sale service of the equipment complies with international ISO 9000 standards.

History 
In 1948, a peat extraction machinery plant was constructed by the railroad station Žodzina.
In 1958 it was renamed into BelAZ. Initially it produced MAZ trucks.
In 1961 the first 27-tonne BelAZ pit and quarry dump truck was manufactured.
In 2006 the independent Mogilev Automobile Plant (MoAZ) was merged into BelAZ.
In fall of 2006 the first delivery of BelAZ-75600.
In April 2012, BelAZ announced it would hold an IPO – the first in Belarus.
In September 2013, BelAZ presented the first sample of mining dump truck BelAZ-75710, the world largest dump truck with 450 tons load capacity.

Political repressions, international sanctions
On 21 June 2021, BelAZ was added to the sanctions list of the European Union for repressions against workers who participated in mass protests against the authoritarian regime of Alexander Lukashenka following the controversial presidential election of 2020. According to the official decision of the EU,
"[BelAZ] is a source of significant revenue for the Lukashenka regime. Lukashenka stated that the government will always support the company, and described it as “Belarusian brand” and “part of the national legacy”. OJSC BelAZ has offered its premises and equipment to stage a political rally in support of the regime. Therefore OJSC “Belaz” benefits from and supports the Lukashenka regime."

Moreover,
"the employees of OJSC “Belaz” who took part in strikes and peaceful protests in the aftermath of the fraudulent August 2020 elections in Belarus were threatened with layoffs and intimidated by the company management. A group of employees was locked indoors by OJSC Belaz to prevent them from joining the other protesters. The company management presented a strike to the media as a staff meeting. Therefore OJSC “Belaz” is responsible for the repression of civil society and supports the Lukashenka regime."

On the same day, BelAZ was also sanctioned by Canada. Later, Switzerland also sanctioned the company.

On 30 June 2021, Rolls-Royce Holdings ended its cooperation with BelAZ as a result of EU sanctions, in September 2021 Cummins joined the ban.

Models

Discontinued models

Mining dump trucks 
 MAZ-525, 25 t (1958–1965)
 BelAZ-540, 27 t (1965)
 BelAZ-540A
 BelAZ-540B, 45 t
 BelAZ-548A, 40 t (1967)
 BelAZ-548B, 65 t
 BelAZ-549, 75–80 t (1969)
 BelAZ-7519, 110–120 t (1977)
 BelAZ-7521, 180 t (1979)
 BelAZ-75211, 170–220 t (1983)
 BelAZ-75214
 BelAZ-7522
 BelAZ-75303
 BelAZ-75483

Current model range

Mining dump trucks 
 BelAZ-7540, 30 t
 BelAZ-7545, 45 t
 BelAZ-7547, 42–45 t
 BelAZ-7555, 55–60 t (since 1994)
 BelAZ-7557, 90 t
 BelAZ-7513, 110–130 t (since 1996)
 BelAZ-7517, 154–160 t
 BelAZ-7530, 180–220 t
 BelAZ-7531, 240 t
 BelAZ-7560, 320–360 t
 BelAZ-7558, 90 t
 BelAZ-7571, 450 t (since 2013)

Note: New models are highlighted in bold.

Construction & road-building vehicles 

 MoAZ-4048, front-end loader, 7.5 t
 BelAZ-7822, front-end loader, 7 t
 BelAZ-7823, Wheel dozer
 Belaz 78221 Wheel loader
 MoAZ-60148, scraper
 MoAZ-60007, scraper
 Concrete mixer trucks

Other vehicles 

 MoAZ-75296, low-profile mining and tunneling concrete mixer truck
 BelAZ-74212, aircraft tug

Other products 
 Articulated haulers
 Underground vehicles
 Vehicles for mine-servicing works
 Vehicles for metallurgical works
 Goods wagons: covered hoppers, open wagons, flat wagons

Sponsorship in football 
 FC Torpedo-BelAZ Zhodino

See also 
BelAZ-75600 - off-highway, ultra class haul trucks
BelAZ-75710 - the world's largest and heaviest dump truck.

References

External links 

MoAZ home page in English
Belarusian Machine Building: Once a Nation's Pride, Now a Burden? 

BelAz gallery, in Russian
The fullest technical information. 3D models BELAZ

 
Truck manufacturers of Belarus
Mining equipment companies
Rolling stock manufacturers of Belarus
Construction equipment manufacturers of Belarus
Engineering vehicles
Zhodzina
Vehicle manufacturing companies established in 1948
1948 establishments in Belarus
1948 establishments in the Soviet Union
Belarusian brands
Soviet brands